This is a list of documentary films produced in Albania.

Documentary films by decade
 Documentary films of the 1940s
 Documentary films of the 1950s
 Documentary films of the 1960s
 Documentary films of the 1970s
 Documentary films of the 1980s
 Documentary films of the 1990s

See also
 Albanian National Center of Cinematography
 Albanian Central Film Archive
 Cinema of Kosovo

External links
 Albanian Film Database

Documentary films